Julio Voltio (born as Julio Irving Ramos Filomeno on June 11, 1977 in Santurce, Puerto Rico) is a Puerto Rican former reggaeton artist. A pioneer of the reggaeton genre, Voltio retired from music in 2014 and dedicated himself to preaching  Christianity.

His nickname came to be as the result of an accident. Before joining Karel, he worked as an electrician. One day, he stuck his hand in the wrong place and got shocked. Everyone then called him "Bombillo" (Light Bulb) and "Corto Circuito" (Short Circuit), until eventually giving him a nickname that stuck: "Voltio" (Spanish word for volt).

Julio Voltio now identifies as a born-again Christian. Julio said in an interview: "Yes, really I accepted Christ as my savior, I really do because sometimes you have a void in the hearts and therefore need to search for Christ."

Music career 
Growing up in the Parque Ecuestre section of Carolina, Voltio entered the music business as a teenager. Together with Rey 29 and Héctor el Father, he formed The Masters of Funk. Although the trio released no listed albums, they were influential in starting the reggaeton movement.

Shortly after separating from The Masters of Funk, Voltio partnered with Karel, a neighborhood friend, to form Karel y Voltio. They released their debut album Los Dueños del Estilo in 2003. The album languished, however, and the duo's enthusiasm dwindled. Karel was last featured in La Mision 4. Voltio was signed under Pina Records company. Pina stole money from Voltio and he left that company, then went into a musical battle (Tiraera Pina, Bling Bling, Wasa Wasa) against Lito y Polaco, Pina Records main artists. With few options, Voltio was preparing to exit the music business when Tego Calderón, a leading artist with White Lion Records, convinced him to sign with the label. Having taken Tego's advice, Voltio released the album Voltage AC, with the hits "Bumper", "No Amarres Fuego" (featuring Zion & Lennox) and "Julito Maraña".

Voltio also featured on a remix of the song "Locked Up" by Akon, which was released in the UK as part of Locked Up-Global Remixes.

Having experienced relative success, Voltio returned with his a self-titled release in 2005, which included his biggest hit to date "Chulín Culín Chunflai", which features Residente Calle 13 and a remix version with Three 6 Mafia. In 2006, Voltio was on Frankie 2006 remix of his "Puerto Rico".

Voltio recently teamed up with Calle 13 to speak out against police brutality in Puerto Rico. On August 11, 2008, announced the publication of a documentary titled "En vivo desde Oso Blanco". The production covers the time that Voltio spent in prison.

Voltio is also included on the Grand Theft Auto IV soundtrack with his song Pónmela from the 2007 release of En lo Claro. He made collaborations with Jowell & Randy (Welcome to my crib).

En lo Claro has experienced mild success in contrast to Voltio's first two releases, garnering #36 on the U.S. Billboard Top Latin Albums chart. The album also peaked at #24 on the Billboard Top Heatseekers chart.

In 2014, Voltio left reggaeton and converted to Christianity.

Discography

Albums 
Solo albums
 2004: Voltage AC
 2005: Voltage DC
 2007: En lo Claro

Other albums
 2003: Los Dueños del Estilo

Singles

 2004: "Julito Maraña" (feat. Tego Calderón)
 2004: "Bumper"
 2004: "Lock Up" (Akon feat Voltio)
 2005: "Mambo"
 2005: "Bumper (Official Remix)" (feat. Pitbull & Lil Rob)
 2005: "Chulin Culin Chunfly" (feat. Residente Calle 13)
 2005: "Chulin Culin Chunfly (remix)" (feat. Residente Calle 13 & Three 6 Mafia)
 2005: "Se Van, Se Van" (feat. Tego Calderón)
 2005: "Matando La Liga"
 2005: "Culebra"
 2005: "Chévere" (feat. Notch)
 2006: "Claro de Luna"
 2006: "Let's Go To My Crib" (feat. Jowell & Randy)
 2007: "Los Capo" (feat. Ñejo & Dalmata, Guelo Star, Zion, De La Ghetto, Syko, Héctor el Father & Jowell & Randy)
 2007: "El Mellao"
 2008: "Pónmela" (feat. Jowell & Randy)
 2008: "Un Amor Como Tú" (feat. Arcangel)
 2009: "Esto Es A Palo"
 2009: "Dimelo Mami"
 2009: "Dimelo Mami (Remix)" (feat.Daddy Yankee)
 2009: "Tumba El Piquete" (feat.J-Alvarez)
 2012: "La Kiebra nuka remix" (feat.Mr. Pelón (503))
 2014: "Siempre Estoy" (feat. Ñengo Flow)

Guest appearances
 1993: "No Te Canses, El Funeral" Daddy Yankee (feat. Voltio)
 1998: "Muévela" DJ Dicky (feat. Voltio)
 2003: "Mi Libertad"  (feat. Jerry Rivera) 
 2004: "12 Discípulos" (Eddie Dee feat. Daddy Yankee, Tego Calderon, Ivy Queen, Zion & Lennox, Vico C, Nicky Jam, Voltio, Gallego, Wiso G and Johhny Prez)
 2005: "En Este Infierno" K-Narias (feat. Voltio)
 2005: "Amor de Una Noche" (feat. N'Klabe)
 2005: "So Amazing"  Jagged Edge (feat. Voltio) 
 2006: "Lo Que Son Las Cosas (Reggaeton Version)" Anaís (feat. Voltio) 
 2006: "En Mi Puertorro"  Andy Montañez (feat. Voltio) 
 2006: "Abusando Del Genero"  DJ Joe (feat. Yomo, Voltio, Trebol Clan, Zion & Lennox, Tempo) 
 2006: "Mil Caminos"  Leonor (feat. Voltio) 
 2006: "Payaso"  Tego Calderón (feat. Voltio & Eddie Dee) 
 2006: "Gansta"  Baby Ranks (feat. Voltio) 
 2006: "Llegaron Los Rebuleros"  Maestro (feat. Voltio) 
 2007: "Ella Volvió" (feat. N'Klabe)
 2007: "Dale Mami Damelo"  DJ Nelson (feat. Voltio) 
 2007: "Lo Hecho Hecho Esta"  Tego Calderón (feat. Pirulo, Voltio, Ñejo, Chyno Nyno) 
 2007: "Get Me Bodied"  Beyoncé (feat. Voltio) 
 2007: "Si Me Matan"  Alexis & Fido (feat. Lapiz Conciente, Luis Vargas, Voltio, De La Ghetto, Jadiel, Primer Mandatario & Sofla) 
 2007: "Easy" Don Omar (feat. Zion, Voltio, Eddie Dee, Tego Calderón & Cosculluela)
 2008: "Don't Stay Away from the Sunlight"  Turbulence (feat. Voltio) 
 2008: "Levántate" J-King & Maximan (feat. Voltio, Guelo Star)
 2008: "Na De Na (Remix)" Angel & Khriz (feat. John Eric, Gocho, Alexis, Voltio, Arcangel, & Franco "El Gorila")
 2008: "Ella Menea (Remix)" NG2
 2010: "Hipnótika" A.B. Quintanilla Y Los Kumbia All Starz (feat. Voltio and Marciano Cantero from Los Enanitos Verdes)
 2012: "Ella Lo Que Quiere Es Salsa" (Víctor Manuelle (feat. Voltio and Jowell & Randy)

Filmography
 2008: Feel The Noise as himself
 2009: Talento de Barrio as himself
 TBA: Julito Maraña

Note

References

External links 
 
 Official MySpace

1977 births
Living people
People from Santurce, Puerto Rico
Puerto Rican rappers
Puerto Rican reggaeton musicians
Sony Music Latin artists
Converts to Christianity
Puerto Rican Christians
21st-century American rappers